"Stay by My Side" a song recorded by Japanese singer Mai Kuraki. It was released on March 15, 2000, as the second single from Kuraki's debut studio album, Delicious Way (2000). It was written by Kuraki, Aika Ohno, and the Boston-based music production team, Cybersound. It is a gospel-infused J-pop and R&B song that talks about the protagonist's dream to be with her partner as long as possible.

The single debuted atop on the Oricon Weekly Singles chart, becoming Kuraki's first number-one single on that chart. On the Oricon chart for the third week of May in 2000, the first three of her singles, "Love, Day After Tomorrow", "Stay by My Side", and "Secret of My Heart" charted inside top 15 simultaneously.

Track listing

Credits and personnel
Credits adapted from the liner notes of the CD single.

Mai Kuraki – vocals, backing vocals, songwriting
Aika Ohno - composer
Masataka Kitaura – composer
Michael Africk – backing vocals
Perry Geyer – computer programming, sound producer
Greg Hawkes – keyboards
Miguel Sá Pessoa – keyboards, mix
Toast (Shaun D. Rosenberg) – DJ
Cybersound - DJ, tracking
Kanonji – production, executive producer

Charts

Weekly charts

Monthly charts

Year-end charts

Certifications and sales

|-
! scope="row"| Japan (RIAJ)
| Million
| 922,140 
|-
|}

References

External links
Mai Kuraki Official Website

Oricon Weekly number-one singles
2000 singles
Mai Kuraki songs
Songs written by Aika Ohno
2000 songs
Giza Studio singles
Song recordings produced by Daiko Nagato